Puerto Navarino is a Chilean port on the Beagle Channel in western Navarino Island opposite Ushuaia in Argentina. Puerto Navarino is part of Cabo de Hornos commune. It is 54km west of Puerto Williams along a gravel road. It is one of the most southerly populated places in Chile.

References

External links
Comuna de Cabo de Hornos / Commune of Cabo de Hornos official website
official website of Puerto Williams

Cities and towns in Tierra del Fuego
Ports and harbours of Chile
Populated places in Antártica Chilena
Navarino Island
Populated places in the fjords and channels of Chile